The following highways are numbered 665:

Canada

United States